Shukria Asil (Arabic: شكرية أصيل) is an Afghan women's rights activist. In 2009, she succeeded in reversing the firing of three women teachers in Baghlan, who had been fired due to negative information being published about them by the Ministry of Education. As of 2010 she serves as one of four female members of the Baghlan Provincial Council, and as of 2012 she is the head of the Baghlan Provincial Culture and Information Department.

Asil also intervened in the case of a girl rejected by her family for being gang-raped, successfully reuniting the family, although the provincial governor had discouraged her from doing so. Her other work for women's rights includes creating networking groups for women, leading the fight for women's driving schools, and expanding educational opportunities for young girls.

She has faced threats of kidnapping and death for her work, and had to change her address at least once.

She received a 2010 International Women of Courage Award.

References

Living people
Afghan activists
Afghan women activists
Afghan women's rights activists
Year of birth missing (living people)
Recipients of the International Women of Courage Award